Fernando Paniagua Marchena (born 9 September 1988) is a Costa Rican football midfielder who plays for CF Universidad de Costa Rica

Career
In March 2014, Paniagua signed a three-year contract with Tippeligaen side Start. After a year with Start, Paniagua and Start agreed to mutually terminates Paniagua's contract at the end of March 2015.

Career statistics

References

External links
 

1988 births
Living people
People from Guanacaste Province
Association football midfielders
Costa Rican footballers
Deportivo Saprissa players
Santos de Guápiles footballers
C.F. Universidad de Costa Rica footballers
IK Start players
Costa Rican expatriate footballers
Expatriate footballers in Norway
Costa Rican expatriate sportspeople in Norway
Liga FPD players
Eliteserien players